Short track speed skating at the 2006 Winter Olympics was held over thirteen days, from 12 to 25 February. Eight events were contested at the Torino Palavela. In the men's competition, Ahn Hyun-soo earned a medal in each event, winning three golds. On the women's side, Jin Sun-yu scored three gold medals.

Medal summary

Medal table

Men's events

 
* Skaters who did not participate in the final, but received medals.

Women's events

 
* Skaters who did not participate in the final, but received medals.

Records
Of the four Olympic records set in Turin, three of them came in the men's 1000 metres.

Participating NOCs
Twenty-four nations competed in the short track at Torino.

References

 
2006 Winter Olympics events
2006
2006 in short track speed skating
Olympics, 2006